South Yorkshire Fire and Rescue is the statutory fire and rescue service for the area of South Yorkshire, England. The service covers the areas of Barnsley, Doncaster, Rotherham and Sheffield. In 2020, Chris Kirby was appointed its Chief Fire Officer.

Performance
In 2018/2019, every fire and rescue service in England and Wales was subjected to a statutory inspection by His Majesty's Inspectorate of Constabulary and Fire & Rescue Services (HIMCFRS). The inspection investigated how well the service performs in each of three areas. On a scale of outstanding, good, requires improvement and inadequate, South Yorkshire Fire and Rescue Service was rated as follows:

Fire stations

Currently the service operates 21 fire stations across the county, which are staffed on a wholetime basis, wholetime and day-crewed, wholetime and retained, or retained-only.  with the remaining four staffed by on-call retained firefighters.
The stations are grouped into four districts: Barnsley, Doncaster, Rotherham and Sheffield.

See also

 Fire service in the United Kingdom
 Fire apparatus
 Firefighter
 FiReControl
 List of British firefighters killed in the line of duty

References

External links 

 
South Yorkshire Fire and Rescue Service at HMICFRS
 Sheffield Fire Brigade History website

Fire and rescue services of England
Organisations based in Sheffield
South Yorkshire